Nicholas Felton (1556–1626) was an English academic, the Bishop of Bristol from 1617 to 1619, and then Bishop of Ely.

Life
He was born in Great Yarmouth and educated at Pembroke Hall, Cambridge. He was rector of St Mary-le-Bow church in London, from 1597 to 1617; and also rector at St Antholin, Budge Row. St Antholin's was on Watling Street, and it has been suggested that the 1606 play The Puritan, or the Widow of Watling Street alludes to Felton through the name Nicholas St Antlings of one of the Widow's serving men.

He was Master at Pembroke, where he became a Fellow in 1583, from 1616 to 1619. In university politics, he conspicuously supported Thomas Howard, Earl of Berkshire, against George Villiers, Duke of Buckingham, in an election for the position of Chancellor of the University of Cambridge, in 1626. King Charles I of England supported Buckingham, and this contest became a test of strength of the religious groups, Puritan and Anglican. He employed as chaplain Edmund Calamy, who had studied at Pembroke, already dissenting from orthodox Anglican belief.

His death was the occasion of an early Latin poem by John Milton.

Notes

1556 births
1626 deaths
Bishops of Bristol
Bishops of Ely
Masters of Pembroke College, Cambridge
17th-century Church of England bishops
People from Great Yarmouth
Alumni of Pembroke College, Cambridge